Knut Børsheim (born 29 April 1987) is a Norwegian professional golfer.

Amateur career
Børsheim was one of the top amateurs in Norway, winning the golf medal at the national boys' championships, and winning a professional event in Scandinavia in 2006 while still an amateur.

In the autumn of 2006, he opted to take a golf scholarship to Arizona State University for the next four years. He was awarded the Pac-10 Men's Golf Scholar Athlete of the Year for 2009-10.

While at college, Børsheim represented Norway at the European Amateur Team Championship four years in a row 2007, 2008, 2009 and 2010.

He was named for the 2010 European Bonallack Trophy team against an Asia and Pacific team, but the event was cancelled.

He turned professional upon college graduation in 2010.

Professional career
Børsheim entered PGA Tour qualifying school after turning professional, but missed the final stage, and turned his attention towards Europe. He played on invites on the Challenge Tour for much of 2011, and earned his best result as a professional when he finished as runner-up at the Kazakhstan Open, the richest event on that tour. Børsheim finished just outside the top twenty players at season's end who earn promotion to the European Tour. However, he put that disappointment behind him by coming through European qualifying school to earn his full tour card for 2012.

In 2012, Børsheim finished 167th on the European Tour and returned to the Challenge Tour.  In 2013, he finished 49th on the Challenge Tour and retired from touring golf.  He then went to work in stockbroking for a bank in Oslo.  In a 2014 interview, he said that he left professional golf because he "didn't really enjoy the travelling side of things".

Professional wins (1)

Nordic Golf League wins (1)

Amateur wins
2009 Norwegian Amateur

Team appearances
Amateur
European Boys' Team Championship (representing Norway): 2003, 2004, 2005
Jacques Léglise Trophy (representing Continental Europe): 2004
Eisenhower Trophy (representing Norway): 2006, 2008
European Amateur Team Championship (representing Norway): 2007, 2008, 2009, 2010
Source:

See also
2011 European Tour Qualifying School graduates

References

External links

Norwegian male golfers
Arizona State Sun Devils men's golfers
European Tour golfers
Sportspeople from Bergen
1987 births
Living people